is a train station in the city of Kurashiki, Okayama Prefecture, Japan.

Lines
 Ibara Railway
 Ibara Line

Adjacent stations

|-
!colspan=5|Ibara Railway

Railway stations in Okayama Prefecture
Railway stations in Japan opened in 1999